Friedrich Karl Joseph Reichsfreiherr von Erthal (3 January 1719 – 25 July 1802) was prince-elector and archbishop of Mainz from 18 July 1774 to 4 July 1802, shortly before the end of the archbishopric in the Reichsdeputationshauptschluss.

Family
Erthal was born in Lohr am Main on 3 January 1719. His younger brother, Franz Ludwig von Erthal, was the prince-bishop of Würzburg and Bamberg.

Election

Erthal's predecessor, archbishop Emmerich Joseph von Breidbach zu Bürresheim, had introduced some ideas of the Enlightenment, and had been a popular figure. After his death, the Domkapitel was split in two fractions, one representing the openness to reform of the Enlightenment, the larger one advocating immediate restoration. Directly after the death of archbishop Emmerich Joseph, Friedrich von Erthal, then Domkustos, was charged with reducing the influence of the Enlightenment in the schools and monasteries of the archbishopric. After his election on 18 July 1774, and his election as Bishop of Worms, he assigned many opponents of the Enlightenment to important positions.

Both the papal nuncio and the emperor Joseph II had expected Erthal's election to improve relationships with the Archbishopric. However, Erthal, in his position as Archchancellor wanted to have an important role in the politics of the Holy Roman Empire himself, opposing the dynastical tendencies of the Emperor. In 1785, he even joined the Prussian-led mostly Protestant Fürstenbund, a coalition of princes organized to oppose Joseph's scheme to exchange Bavaria for Belgium.

Relationship to the Enlightenment 

Erthal did not pursue his opposition to the enlightenment for very long, reinstating the modern government of his predecessor in 1777. After 1781, Erthal's politics were dominated by the Enlightenment. The universities of Mainz and Erfurt were reformed according to new ideas, and a hymnal in German language was published. He became one of the most notable supporters of free-thought in theology and of Febronianism in the government of the Church. Georg Forster, a Protestant, became his librarian and William Heinse, another Protestant, and author of the lascivious romance "Ardinghello", was his official reader. Erthal suppressed the Carthusian monastery and two nunneries at Mainz and used their revenues to meet the expenses of the university, in which he appointed numerous Protestants and free-thinkers as professors. Notorious unbelievers such as Felix Anthony Blau and others were invited to the university in 1784 to supplant the Jesuits in the faculty of theology.

Theological position
As a spiritual ruler, Erthal was guided by the principles of Febronianism. In order to increase his political influence he joined (25 October 1785) the Confederation of Princes which was established by King Frederick the Great. Somewhat later, however, he resumed his opposition to papal authority and continued to adhere to the  even after the other archbishops had rejected it.

End of the archbishopric

His opposition was made futile by the revolutionary wars: The troops of General Custine occupied Mainz on 21 October 1792; Mainz capitulated without a fight. Erthal fled to Aschaffenburg for the time of the republican government in Mainz. 

By the treaty of Campo Formio in 1797 Erthal was deprived of his possessions west of the Rhine and by the Concordat of 1801 he lost also spiritual jurisdiction over that part of his diocese. The negotiations concerning the reimbursement of Erthal for the loss of his territory west of the Rhine were not yet completed when he died on 25 July 1802, and was succeeded as archbishop by Karl Theodor Anton Maria von Dalberg.

Erthal is buried in St. Peter und Alexander collegiate church at Aschaffenburg.

References

1719 births
1802 deaths
Barons of Germany
Archbishop-Electors of Mainz
18th-century Roman Catholic archbishops in the Holy Roman Empire
19th-century Roman Catholic archbishops in the Holy Roman Empire